Inveralmond Roundabout is a major traffic roundabout in Perth, Scotland. It is one of Perth's two major roundabouts, the other being at  Broxden Junction, where the A9 merges with the M90,  to the south-southwest.

Inveralmond Industrial Estate is located adjacent to the roundabout to the northwest, accessed by the Ruthvenfield Road exit.

The Cross Tay Link Road is under construction as of July 2022. When completed it will link the section of the A9 immediately north of the roundabout with the A93 and A94 near Scone, to the east.

References 

Roundabouts in Scotland
Transport in Perth, Scotland